Marcus Charles Beilby (born 20 November 1951, in Western Australia), is an Australian realist painter. Beilby grew up in the Perth suburb of Mount Pleasant. He was educated at Applecross Senior High School and the Claremont Technical College, where he received a Diploma of Fine Arts (Painting) in 1975.

Beilby was the winner of the 1987 Sir John Sulman Prize for Australian Genre Painting. The winning painting, Crutching the ewes has been described as a homage to Tom Roberts' Shearing the Rams.

He currently resides in East Fremantle, Western Australia.

His father was the noted Australian author and novelist Richard Beilby.

Notes

External links
Marcus Beilby's website
Claremont school of art

1951 births
Artists from Perth, Western Australia
Realist painters
Australian painters
Living people
People educated at Applecross Senior High School